The Monte Carlo Open was a European Tour golf tournament which was played annually from 1984 to 1992. It was staged at the Monte Carlo Golf Club near Mont Agel in France, as there is no space for a golf course in Monaco. The winners of the tournament included two major champions, the Spaniard Seve Ballesteros, who won in 1986, and Welshman Ian Woosnam, who won the final three events. In 1992 the prize fund was £450,000, which was mid-range for a European Tour event at that time.

Winners

Notes

References

External links
Coverage on the European Tour's official site

Former European Tour events
Defunct golf tournaments in France
Golf in Monaco
Sports competitions in Monaco
1984 establishments in France
1992 disestablishments in France